Cumberland is an edge city in Cobb County located in an unincorporated area of the northwest Atlanta metropolitan area, Georgia, United States. With approximately 122,000 workers and 103,000 residents, Cumberland is the region's fifth-largest business district, and is marked by several modern skyscrapers rising from the wooded hills above the freeways.

Geography
Although small portions lie within incorporated Smyrna, the majority of the area is unincorporated and shares ZIP code 30339 with the Vinings area, which the United States Postal Service assigns as an Atlanta mailing address, although "Vinings" is acceptable as an alternate. While there are no official boundaries (except for the CID, which is a 5½-square-mile area that includes the interchanges of I-75 (Exit#s 258,9,60) and I-285 (Exit#s 19,20), and U.S. Highway 41), the business district generally extends as far northeast as the Wildwood Office Park on Powers Ferry Road, and up Cobb Parkway, the district's main street. Windy Hill Road is generally the northern extent of the district. To the south and west, it extends down Cumberland Parkway and Paces Ferry Road.

History

Cumberland has changed immensely over the past 50 years. From 1927 to 1960, the area contained Camp Bert Adams, a Boy Scout reservation which still has a road bearing its name in the Vinings vicinity (the camp moved in 1960 to a site south of Covington). The area began seeing growth following World War II, but major development did not occur until Cumberland Mall opened as Georgia's largest and metro Atlanta's sixth enclosed regional mall in 1973. This paved the way for several other towers, retail strips and hotels. In 1988, property owners formed the Cumberland Community Improvement District (Cumberland CID), the first in Georgia. The CID, a self-taxing district, has raised millions and has completed several infrastructure improvements in the area since its inception. During the summer of 1994, the Cobb-Marietta Exhibit Hall and Coliseum Authority built the $48 million Cobb Galleria Centre by renovating the existing mall there, and it has become another success for the district. A few small shopping centers were constructed in the mid-1990s, and a Cumberland Mall expansion and renovation was completed in 2006. Construction was completed on the Cobb Energy Performing Arts Centre in late 2007, adding nightlife to the area. The Atlanta Opera, founded in 1979, moved its base to this location.

Transportation
The dominant form of transportation in Cumberland, as with most suburban edge cities, is the automobile, which is transported along a network of collector roads. Cumberland Boulevard encircles most of the area, and then continues northeast to Wildwood as Windy Ridge Parkway after crossing US Highway 41 (Cobb Parkway). Windy Ridge runs through the Interstate North office park, located immediately to the north of the interchange, and home to the Weather Channel. Interstate North Parkway runs parallel to 75 southeast to 285, then parallels it (and Powers Ferry) across the Chattahoochee River. Akers Mill Road starts in the east at Powers Ferry, is broken by a stretch of Cumberland Boulevard, then continues west across 41. Circle 75 Parkway begins at Windy Hill Road, opposite the I-75 southbound off-ramp, and parallels the road until turning southwest along I-285, becoming Spring Road at 41 (and then Concord Road at Atlanta Road in Smyrna). CobbLinc , Marietta/Cobb County's Transit System serves the District in addition to one  MARTA bus line making connections at the Cumberland/Galleria Transfer station. The former Louisville & Nashville (Now CSXT) mainline from Cincinnati to Atlanta, runs just west of Truist Park.

Economy

Cumberland's office towers house some of the area's 24 million square feet (over 2.2 million square meters) of office space, containing more office space than downtown Miami and making it metro Atlanta's fifth-largest commercial office district, after Downtown, Midtown, Buckhead, and Perimeter Center. Companies such as Travelport, The Home Depot, Genuine Parts Company, Papa John's, RaceTrac, and The Weather Channel are headquartered in the area. Cumberland also houses some ten million square feet (930,000m²) of retail, with its focal point being Cumberland Mall.

In 2017, the Atlanta Braves opened Truist Park and The Battery Atlanta, a mixed-use development surrounding the ballpark, at the west-northwest side of the interchange of I-75 and I-285, just north of Cobb Galleria, with a pedestrian bridge connecting both complexes.

Attractions

 Chattahoochee River National Recreation Area
 Cobb Energy Performing Arts Centre
 Cobb Galleria Centre
 Cumberland Mall
 Silver Comet Trail
 Truist Park
 The Battery Atlanta

References

Unincorporated communities in Cobb County, Georgia
Unincorporated communities in Georgia (U.S. state)
Georgia populated places on the Chattahoochee River
Edge cities in the Atlanta metropolitan area